Moses ben Joseph Haida was a German mathematician from Hamburg. He was a grandson of Samuel Haida, author of Zikkukin de-nura. He was the author of Sefer ma'aseh ḥoresh ve-ḥoshev, an arithmetic, written at the time of the great fire of Altona (Frankfurt, 1711).

Publications

References
 

18th-century German Jews
18th-century German mathematicians
Jews from Hamburg
People from Hamburg
Scientists from Hamburg